Albury (Wiradjuri: Bungambrawatha) is a major regional city in New South Wales, Australia. It is located on the Hume Highway and the northern side of the Murray River. Albury is the seat of local government for the council area which also bears the city's name – the City of Albury. It is on the Victoria-New South Wales border.

Albury has an urban population of 49,172 and is separated from its twin city in Victoria, Wodonga, by the Murray River. Together, the two cities form an urban area with a population of 93,603 at June 2018.

Said to be named after a village in England, Albury developed as a major transport link between New South Wales and Victoria and was proclaimed a city in 1946.

History
The Wiradjuri people were the first known humans to occupy the area, (Wiradjuri northern dialect pronunciation [wiraːjd̪uːraj]) or Wirraayjuurray people (Wiradjuri southern dialect pronunciation [wiraːjɟuːraj]) are a group of Indigenous Australian Aboriginal people that were united by a common language, strong ties of kinship and survived as skilled hunter–fisher–gatherers in family groups or clans scattered throughout central New South Wales.

In the 21st century, major Wiradjuri groups live in Condobolin, Peak Hill, Narrandera and Griffith. There are significant populations at Wagga Wagga and Leeton and smaller groups at West Wyalong, Parkes, Dubbo, Forbes, Cootamundra, Cowra and Young.

European exploration
The explorers Hume and Hovell arrived at what their maps called 'Crossing Point', but is now known as the Murray River at Albury, on 16 November 1824. They named the river the Hume River, after Hume's father, and the next day inscribed a tree by the river bank before continuing their journey south to Westernport in Victoria. In 1830, explorer Captain Charles Sturt discovered the Hume River downstream at its junction with the Murrumbidgee River. Not realising it was the same river, he named it the Murray River. Both names persisted for some time, Hume falling into disuse eventually in favour of Murray. The Aboriginal name for the river was Millewa. A crossing place for the Murray became popular close to where Hovell inscribed the tree.  In summer it was usually possible to cross the river by foot.

English settlement
Among the first squatters to follow in the steps of the explorers and settle in the district were William Wyse and Charles Ebden.

The first European buildings erected at the crossing place were a provisions store and some small huts. A survey for a town was commissioned in 1838 by Assistant Surveyor Thomas Townsend who mapped out Wodonga Place (the present Wodonga Place) as the western boundary, Hume Street as the northern boundary, Kiewa Street to the east and Nurigong Street to the south, with Townsend Street being the only other north–south road, and Ebden and Hovell Streets being the two other east–west roads. Townsend proposed the settlement be named 'Bungambrawatha ', the Aboriginal name for the area, but when his plan was eventually approved and published in the Government Gazette on 13 April 1839 the name had been changed to Albury.

Albury is said to be named after a village in Kent, England which it apparently resembled, though that referenced publication seems incorrect since there is no Albury in Kent. More  plausible is Albury in adjacent Surrey, straddling the Tillingbourne river and a significant 18th century site of mills and industry.

Frontier town

By 1847 the Albury settlement included two public houses and a handful of huts, a police barracks and a blacksmiths. A log punt established in 1844 serviced the crossing of the Murray River. Albury Post Office opened on 1 April 1843, closed in 1845, then reopened in the township on 1 February 1847.

In 1851, with the separation of Victoria from New South Wales, and the border falling on the Murray River, Albury found itself a frontier town. With an increase in commerce with Melbourne, the first bridge was built in 1860 to the design of surveyor William Snell Chauncy. Albury at this time became a customs post between the two colonies as New South Wales held a protectionist stance after gaining its constitution in 1856.

Albury was at this time starting to grow substantially with German speaking immigrants using the area to grow grapes for wine. By the 1870s a butter factory was established, flour mill, wineries and locally brewed cider and soft drinks were available.

The railway line from Sydney arrived at Albury in 1881 (see Transport-Rail below). A temporary wooden railway bridge joined the line to the Victorian network in 1883. New South Wales and Victoria had different track gauges until 1962, when the first train ran direct from Sydney to Melbourne. The two states could not initially agree which should be the transfer point so they had an expensive and attractive iron lattice bridge sent from Scotland which accommodated both gauges.

In 1888, Albury built its first school house. The city's first mayor, James Fallon, was an innovator of the Public School, funding a demonstration High School to be built on Kiewa Street.  Albury High School opened in Kiewa Street in 1927.

20th-century city

The Royal Commission on Sites for the Seat of Government of the Commonwealth report of 1903 recommended Albury (along with Tumut) as the preferred candidate for the national capital, though the proposal met staunch opposition from residents. At a public meeting, just one member of parliament voted in favour of Albury – Isaac Isaacs, member for Indi. The lack of support for other places ultimately led to the selection of Canberra as the preferred site.

In 1934, a Douglas DC-2 airliner of KLM (the "Uiver"), a competitor in the MacRobertson Trophy Air Race (also known as the London to Melbourne Air Race), made an emergency night landing at the town's racecourse after becoming lost during severe thunderstorms. After signalling by Morse code A-L-B-U-R-Y to the lost aircrew by using the entire town's public lighting system, the "Uiver" was guided in to land safely. The makeshift runway at the racecourse was illuminated by the headlights of cars belonging to local residents who had responded to a special news bulletin on ABC radio station 2CO. After refuelling the next day, many local volunteers helped pull the stranded aircraft out of the mud and the aircraft was able to take off and continue to Melbourne where it won first prize in the race's handicap category and was second overall.

Albury and Wodonga played a military role in World War II with the establishment of ordnance bases at Bandiana and Bonegilla. Proclaimed a city in 1946, Albury played a role in the post-war immigration to Australia with the establishment nearby of Australia's first migrant centre, the Bonegilla Migrant Reception and Training Centre in 1947.

Albury's proximity to Wodonga has spurred several efforts to achieve some kind of municipal governmental union (see Albury-Wodonga). In 1973, Albury-Wodonga was selected as the primary focus of the Whitlam federal government's scheme to redirect the uncontrolled growth of Australia's large coastal cities (Sydney and Melbourne in particular) by encouraging decentralisation. Grand plans were made to turn Albury-Wodonga into a major inland city and large areas of the surrounding farmland were compulsorily purchased by the government. Some industries were enticed to move there, and a certain amount of population movement resulted. However, the current urban population is approximately 92,200.

Population
According to the 2016 census of Population, there were 47,974 people in the Albury part of the Albury – Wodonga Urban Centre.
 Aboriginal and Torres Strait Islander people made up 2.9% of the population.
 81.2% of people were born in Australia. The next most common countries of birth were England 1.9%, India 1.2%, New Zealand 1.0%, Philippines 0.6% and Bhutan 0.6%.
 86.0% of people only spoke English at home. Other languages spoken at home included Nepali 1.1%, Punjabi 0.6%, Mandarin 0.3%, Greek 0.3% and Hindi 0.3%.
 The most common responses for religion were No Religion 27.7%, Catholic 25.4% and Anglican 16.7%.

Geography
Albury is situated above the river flats of the Murray River, in the foothills of the Great Dividing Range.

Climate

Albury has a warm, temperate climate, with cool, damp winters and very warm to hot, mostly dry, summers. Under the Köppen climate classification, Albury has a humid subtropical climate (Cfa), but would have tendencies of a Mediterranean climate (Csa) as well.

An average of 17 days with a maximum above  occur in this summer period. Albury gets approximately 20 days per year featuring minima of below freezing, although the high cloud cover tends to limit frost. Sleet may occur during the winter months, but settling snowfalls are very rare. The highest temperature recorded at Albury was 46.1 °C on 4 January 2020, and the lowest temperature was −4.0 °C recorded on 8 August 1994 (both at the Airport AWS station).

Albury has quite a high evaporation rate in summer, giving the environment a more arid look compared to drier cities like Melbourne (although Albury in winter has a much greener look). The city enjoys a high amount of sunshine, getting around 108 days of clear skies annually (with the vast majority in summer and autumn)—The sunniest month is January, with 14.6 clear days (and 7.7 cloudy days); and the cloudiest month is July, with 17.5 cloudy days (and only 3.9 clear days).

Albury Airport AWS (1993–2020)

Governance

Albury is the largest city in the Federal electorate of Farrer, whose current representative is Sussan Ley of the Liberal Party. The previous Federal MP was Tim Fischer, who was leader of the National Party and Deputy Prime Minister of Australia. In State politics, the Electoral district of Albury is currently represented by Justin Clancy, also of the Liberal Party. The member for Albury between 1932 and 1946, Alexander Mair, was the Premier of New South Wales from 1939 to 1941.

Local government is the responsibility of the Albury City Council, whose area of responsibility has gradually been enlarged to cover new housing estates on the city's fringes. Amanda Duncan-Strelec became Albury's first female Mayor in 1995, serving for one year. The current Mayor of Albury is Kylie King.

Albury has a longstanding connection to conservative politics. Following the first convention in Canberra to form the Liberal Party of Australia, delegates, including Sir Robert Menzies, met for a second conference in Albury at Mate's Department Store between 14 and 16 December 1944. The delegates agreed on the structure of the party organisation, adopted a provisional constitution and appointed a federal executive until one could be formally elected.

City and suburbs 

The city has a number of suburbs.

Central Albury comprises the central business district (CBD) and lies between the railway line, the Murray River and Monument Hill. Much commercial activity is concentrated here, with Dean Street forming the axis of the main shopping and office district. A cultural precinct is centred on QEII Square, which includes the Albury Library Museum, Murray Art Museum Albury (MAMA), Albury Entertainment Centre and Convention Centre, and the Murray Conservatorium. In the same block are the Post Office, Police Station and Courthouse, and St Matthew's Anglican Church (which was rebuilt after being destroyed by fire in 1990). The Albury City Council offices are located on Kiewa Street.

Forrest Hill lies directly north west and covers the saddle between Monument Hill and Nail Can Hill.  West over the ridge lies West Albury. West Albury is primarily a residential area, but it is home to the First World War Memorial (locally known as the Monument), Riverwood Retirement Village, Albury Wodonga Private Hospital (which lies on the corner of Pemberton Street and the Riverina Highway), and the Albury sewage treatment plant. All of West Albury was once wetland and bush. The only remnant of this is Horseshoe Lagoon to the south-west of the suburb, which has been declared a Wildlife Refuge by NSW Parks & Wildlife and incorporated into the Wonga Wetlands.  To the north-west of West Albury is Pemberton Park.

East Albury lies east of the railway line/freeway from the CBD and houses now cover the eastern hill alongside the Albury Base Hospital, while the flat land directly north of it is covered by parkland, housing and light industry, and a retail park including Harvey Norman and Spotlight franchises, as well as the city airport. The Mungabareena Reserve lies on the Murray south of the airport, and is considered an Aboriginal cultural site of some significance. Mungabareena means "place of plenty talk" in the Wiradjuri language.

South Albury is a mix of residential and industrial areas, with the floodplains south of the railway line and freeway still used for farming and grazing. Flood mitigation works in the 1990s have dramatically reduced the risk of flooding in this area.

North Albury was covered by orchards and vineyards in the first half of the 20th century, and a swamp existed where James Fallon High School now stands. After the World War II, housing development in the area increased and Waugh Road was extended from David Street to the "Five Ways" intersection at Union Road, which ascribes the border between North Albury and Lavington. The locality of Glenroy is adjacent to North Albury, west of the Bungambrawartha Creek, and housing was developed here in the 1970s, including a significant Housing Commission public housing estate.

Lavington is the largest suburb of Albury, and the only suburb which has its own postcode (2641, as opposed to 2640 for the balance of Albury). The suburb was originally named Black Range in the 1850s and 1860s, before being renamed Lavington in 1910. Originally within the boundaries of Hume Shire, it was absorbed into the City of Albury Local Government Area in the 1950s. Housing and commercial development has continued from that point until this day. Prior to 2007, the Hume Highway – passed north-east through the suburb, with Urana Road passing north-west through the suburb from the "Five Ways" road junction. In 2007, an internal bypass of the Hume Freeway was opened, with the former name of the Hume Highway section officially reverting to the commonly used "Wagga Road". The suburb of Lavington also includes the localities of Springdale Heights, Hamilton Valley and Norris Park. Albury's lawn cemetery and crematorium lies at the western end of Union Road.

Thurgoona, to the east of Lavington, was established as a new residential suburb by the Albury Wodonga Development Corporation in the 1970s. In the 1990s a new campus of Charles Sturt University was established here, as was an office of the Murray Darling Freshwater Research Centre. A major golf club (Thurgoona Country Club Resort) is also situated in this suburb.

Further outlying localities include Splitters Creek – a small residential/farming community to the west, Ettamogah (home of the Ettamogah Pub), Bowna and Table Top to the north, and Wirlinga and Lake Hume village to the east. Howlong (20 km west) and Jindera (16 km north) are the closest towns outside the Albury city area, and act as commuter dormitories as well as service centres for the local rural industries.

Albury's houses and buildings are numbered using a special system introduced in 1920.  The centre of the city, which is defined as the intersection of Dean and Olive Streets, is numbered 500, and all other houses are numbered depending on whether they are north, south, east or west of the centre.

Lake Hume

The Hume Dam (colloquially termed the Weir locally) wall construction took 17 years, from 1919 to 1936. A hydro-electric power plant supplies 60 MW of power to the state grid.

The lake was created for irrigation purposes and has caused significant changes to the flow patterns and ecology of the Murray River. Before the construction of the Hume Weir, flows in normal (non-drought) years were low in summer and autumn (though still significant overall), rising in winter due to seasonal rainfall and reaching a flood-peak in late spring due to snow-melt in the Murray and its tributaries' alpine headwaters. The flow is now effectively reversed, with low flows in winter and sustained, relatively high flows in late spring, summer and early autumn to meet irrigation demands, although the spring flood peak has been virtually eliminated. The water released from the base of the Hume Weir is unnaturally cold, at least  colder than it naturally should be. This flow reversal, temperature depression, and removal of the spring flood peak, has led to the drying out and loss of many billabongs and has harmed the populations of native fish of the Murray River such as the iconic Murray Cod.

Flora and fauna
Several threatened species can be found in Albury, including the Sloane's froglet, Regent Honeyeater, and Squirrel Glider (Petaurus norfolcensis).

Transport

Road

Situated on the old Hume Highway, Albury is a major transit point for interstate commerce. In March 2007, Albury was bypassed by a new section of the Hume Freeway. The new freeway includes the new Spirit of Progress Bridge over the Murray River and cost $518 million, the most expensive road project ever built in regional Australia at that time.

In 1888, the Smollett Street wrought iron arch bridge was constructed over Bungambrawatha Creek. Smollet Street was extended westward through the botanical gardens to give direct access from Albury railway station to Howlong Road by a straight street. The bridge is near the botanic gardens and the local swimming pool. The bridge is a rare example of a metal arch bridge in New South Wales, and is the oldest of only two such bridges in New South Wales, the other being the Sydney Harbour Bridge.

Rail

Albury railway station is on the main Sydney-Melbourne railway line. Originally, New South Wales and Victoria had different track gauges, which meant that all travellers in either direction had to change trains at Albury. The broad gauge section of track between Seymour and Albury has now been converted to standard gauge; there is no longer a break-of-gauge at Albury station. The station is served by a three daily V/Line train services from Melbourne (terminating at Albury) and the NSW TrainLink Melbourne-Sydney XPT service, which runs twice daily in each direction.
In 1873, the  broad gauge railway line from Melbourne reached the township of Belvoir/Wodonga. In 1881, the New South Wales  standard gauge railway line reached Albury, with a railway bridge joining the two colonies in 1883. Albury became the stop over, where passengers on the Melbourne-Sydney journey changed trains until 1962, when a standard gauge track was opened between the two capitals. After World War II, in an attempt to overcome the difference in gauges and speed up traffic, a bogie exchange device lifted freight wagons and carriages allowing workers to refit rolling stock with different gauged wheel-sets.

The break of railway gauge at Albury was a major impediment to Australia's war effort and infrastructure during both World Wars, as every soldier, every item of equipment, and all supplies had to be off-loaded from the broad gauge and reloaded onto a standard gauge railway wagon on the opposite side of the platform. In his book Tramps Abroad, writer Mark Twain in 1895 wrote of the break of gauge at Albury and changing trains: ""Now comes a singular thing, the oddest thing, the strangest thing, the most unaccountable marvel that Australia can show. At the frontier between NSW and Victoria our multitude of passengers were routed out of their snug beds by lantern light in the morning in the biting cold to change cars. Think of the paralysis of intellect that gave that idea birth, imagine the boulder it emerged from, on some petrified legislator's shoulders."

During World War II military armouries and warehouses were established in the vicinity of Albury at Bonegilla, Wirlinga and Bandiana. Similar stores were also established at Tocumwal and Oaklands. The conversion of the broad gauge track to a second standard gauge track, between Seymour and Albury, was substantially completed in 2011. The railway station and its associated yards are listed on both the Australian National Heritage List and the New South Wales State Heritage Register.

Air

Albury Airport, owned and operated by the City of Albury, is the second busiest regional airport in New South Wales with around 280,000 passenger movements per year. The road leading from Albury Airport to the city was renamed Borella Road in 1979, in honour of Victoria Cross recipient Albert Chalmers Borella, who was buried at Albury.

Public transport and cycling
Local public transport is provided exclusively by private bus operators, Martin's Albury and Dysons who run day time bus services. The overwhelming majority of local transport is by private car, however traffic is generally moderate. The opening of the Hume Freeway bypass on 4 March 2007, has greatly eased previous traffic congestion on the Lincoln Causeway, allowing vastly better flow between Albury and Wodonga.

There is a good network of bicycle paths in the city, including one to the outlying suburb of Thurgoona and across the state border to Wodonga. A new program has built many more bike tracks, including one from the riverside parks to Wonga Wetlands.

Industry

Albury serves as an administrative centre for the agricultural communities around the area, and the city is the home of the Norske Skog newsprint paper mill which processes the pine logs planted in the mountains to the east, a major processing centre of the Australian Taxation Office, and many other smaller secondary industries. Other large employers are: The Commercial Club Albury and Hume Bank.

One of Albury's major employers was DSI Holdings. Originally the Kaitlers Road facility was opened as an expansion for Borg-Warner in 1971, manufacturing gearboxes for various manufacturers including Ford, Holden and even Maserati. At its peak in 1982 it employed 1251 people. The ownership of the plant changed several times – it was sold in 1987 to Nylex. It was sold again in 2002 to ION Ltd but the company collapsed in 2004 with debt to creditors of $550 million. Due to a failed deal with Holden the workforce was reduced to 750 people. Chinese car manufacturer Geely Group then purchased the bankrupt DSI company for $48 million in March 2009 and the plant then exported automatic transmissions to Geely, Ssangyong and Mahindra. In 2014 DSI Holdings closed the Lavington factory resulting in the loss of the remaining 142 jobs.

The Australian pizza chain Eagle Boys was founded in Albury but ceased operations in 2017 when it was purchased by Pizza Hut.

The Hume Power Station is a hydro-electric power station located at the Hume Dam on the Murray River, near Albury. The power station is operated by Eraring Energy and has two 29 MW turbines.

Tourism
The region surrounding Albury provides a variety of tourist attractions, including the wine region centred on Rutherglen, the historic goldfield towns of Beechworth and Yackandandah, boating, fishing and canoe hire on the many rivers and lakes, including Lake Hume, the forests and mountains of the Great Dividing Range and slightly further afield the snowfields Falls Creek and Mount Hotham.

Within the city of Albury itself, Monument Hill, at the western end of the CBD is the location of the city's distinctive First World War Memorial and provides a good view of the city. Wonga Wetlands boasts more than 150 species of birdlife and is home to the Aquatic Environment Education Centre.

The Hume and Hovell Walking Track, that begins in Yass and follows the route of explorers Hamilton Hume and William Hovell on their 1824 expedition to Port Phillip, ends at the Hovell Tree in South Albury.

Education

Albury is home to one of the campuses of Charles Sturt University. The original Albury campus was located in the northern part of the CBD between Kiewa and David streets. Charles Sturt University relocated to a new purpose built campus at Thurgoona in 2009. CSU offers courses in Arts, Business, Education and Science.

The Albury-Wodonga campus of La Trobe University is also a large and growing educational institution with several thousand undergraduates and postgraduates in its two colleges. Degrees in Business, Arts, Science, Bioscience, Nursing, and various Allied Health disciplines, are available.Riverina Institute of TAFE operates a campus in Albury. There is also a campus of the UNSW Rural Clinical School of Medicine adjacent to the Albury Base Hospital.

Albury is home to nine public primary schools (Albury Public School, Albury North Public School, Albury West Public School, Glenroy Public School, Hume Public School, Lavington Public School, Lavington East Public School, Springdale Heights Public School, and Thurgoona Public School) and three public high schools (Albury High School, James Fallon High School and Murray High School). Several non-government high schools operate in the area including Trinity Anglican College, Xavier High School, The Scots School Albury, Border Christian College, Aspect Riverina school, and St Paul's College. The city is the base for NSW Department of Education South West Riverina regional office.

Culture

HotHouse Theatre is Albury's only professional theatre company, previously known as the  Murray River Performance Group which formed in 1979. It spawned The Flying Fruit Fly Circus in 1979, and these days conducts many productions through the HotHouse Theatre located on Gateway Island between Albury and Wodonga, though still in Victoria rather than New South Wales.

Albury is home to a large number of amateur theatre companies presenting productions ranging from plays in intimate settings to major musicals in the Albury Entertainment Centre and Shakespeare and other events in the Albury Botanic Gardens.  The oldest theatre company in Albury is the Albury Wodonga Theatre Company  and its associated youth theatre company BYTESized Productions often presenting shows in its small theatre in Olive St, South Albury .  Other companies and organisations producing theatre in Albury Wodonga are Livid Productions, The Other Theatre Company, Revolution Theatre, and Centre Stage Event Company.

Jazz Albury Wodonga also regularly hosts national and international artists at the Jazz Basement which is located on Gateway Island.

Touring productions and major music acts often perform at the Albury Entertainment Centre.

Regent Cinemas on Dean Street have operated since 1929.

In 2015 Murray Art Museum Albury (MAMA) was opened, formerly known as Albury Regional Arts Centre. The art museum has 10 galleries with double the space of the former art centre. Canvas Eatery is also attached to MAMA, facing onto Queen Elizabeth II Square.

In 2003, a sister city relationship with Nanping in north western Fujian province, China, was formalised.

Media

Print
Albury serves as a regional media centre. A daily tabloid owned by Nine Entertainment, The Border Mail, is printed in, and has offices in, Wodonga.

Television
Albury has access to all major TV networks, with channels available including Seven, WIN Television (an affiliate of the Nine Network), Southern Cross Ten (an affiliate of the Ten Network), as well as the Australian Broadcasting Corporation (ABC) and the Special Broadcasting Service, more commonly known as SBS.

Of the three main commercial networks, Seven airs a half-hour local news bulletin at 6 pm each weeknight, produced from a newsroom in the city but broadcast from studios in Canberra.

Southern Cross Ten airs the Victorian edition of 10 News First from Melbourne each weeknight at 5 pm, featuring opt-outs for Albury-Wodonga, Echuca-Moama, Shepparton, Wangaratta, Border, Goulburn Valley, North and North East.

WIN Television broadcasts a half-hour state-wide regional WIN News bulletin each weeknight at 5:30 pm, produced from studios in Wollongong. Previously a local edition was produced by WIN until the closure of its Albury newsroom in June 2019.

On 5 May 2011, analogue television transmissions ceased in most areas of regional Victoria and some border regions including Albury-Wodonga. All local free-to-air television services are now broadcasting in digital transmission only. This was done as part of the Federal Government's plan for Digital terrestrial television in Australia where all analogue transmission systems are gradually turned off and replaced with modern DVB-T transmission systems.

Radio

There are three commercial radio stations in Albury – 2AY on 1494 AM, Triple M The Border on 105.7 FM and Hit The Border on 104.9 FM. Hit 104.9 The Border's south eastern network is programmed out of the Albury/Wodonga Hub, going to centres in the Australian Capital Territory, New South Wales, Victoria, Tasmania and South Australia. Broadcasting out of the same building is Triple M 105.7 The Border, which is also networked to local stations around the Australian Capital Territory, New South Wales, Victoria, Tasmania and South Australia.

Albury/Wodonga is one radio market, thus advertisements are directed to both sides of the border. The Albury/Wodonga market underwent significant change in 2005 when Macquarie Southern Cross Media bought 105.7 The River from RG Capital, and 2AY and Star FM from DMG Radio Australia. Due to cross-media ownership laws preventing the ownership of more than two stations in one market, Macquarie was required to sell one of these stations and in September 2005 sold 2AY to the Ace Radio network. 2AY takes much of its daytime and evening programming from 3AW in Melbourne. The ABC produces breakfast and morning radio programs through its local radio network, from the studios of ABC Goulburn Murray, 106.5 FM, located in Wodonga. Most of the rest its programming content is delivered from Melbourne. The ABC also has local transmitters for ABC Radio National, 990 AM; ABC News Radio, 100.9 FM; ABC Classic, 104.1 FM and Triple J, 103.3 FM

There is also a community radio station known as 2REM 107.3 FM. The Albury Wodonga Community Radio station broadcasts a large number of speciality programs including those for the retiree, racing enthusiast, ethnic and Aboriginal communities and a range of musical styles including underground and independent artists from 8:00 pm onwards.

In addition, the area is serviced by SBS Radio 89.5 FM, a national multicutural station; 2APH 101.7 FM, a reading for the print handicapped station and Wodonga TAFE's broadcasting training station, 88.4 Wodonga Community Radio. Albury-Wodonga Christian Broadcasters transmits as 98.5 The Light  ; the other religious station Vision Christian Radio broadcasts on 1611 AM and the dance music station Raw FM airs on 107.9

Sport

Despite being located in New South Wales, Albury is a stronghold of Australian rules. There are five Australian rules clubs in Albury, the Albury Football Club, the Lavington Panthers Football Club, the Murray Magpies Football Club, the North Albury Football Club, and the Thurgoona Football Club. Albury, Lavington Panthers and North Albury compete in the Ovens & Murray Football League, while the Murray Magpies compete in the Hume Football League and Thurgoona compete in the Tallangatta & District Football League. The local Ovens & Murray Football League is one of the strongest regional leagues in the nation, with the Oven's & Murray Grand Final regularly drawing 15,000 spectators. Many players from Albury have moved on to play in the Australian Football League, including Haydn Bunton Senior, who won three Brownlow Medals and was an inaugural legend of the Australian Football Hall of Fame; Fitzroy 1936 Brownlow medallist Denis "Dinny" Ryan; and South Melbourne Brownlow medallist Fred Goldsmith.

Football is also a very popular code with more than 2,500 players registered from twelve local clubs (six from Albury) competing in the Albury Wodonga Football Association. Clubs have teams from U10s through to Senior Men and Women and play on Sundays with MiniRoos providing Football for ages 4–12 on Saturdays. Since 2016, Murray United Football Club, a team encompassing Albury, Wodonga and the wider region, has been competing in the National Premier Leagues Victoria, the highest level of Football in the area. On 9 February 2014, Melbourne City (then known as Melbourne Heart) triumphed 2-1 against Perth Glory in scorching conditions, where the temperature got as high as 41 °C, at the Lavington Sports Ground.

Albury also has three senior rugby league teams, the Albury Thunder, competing in the Group 9 Rugby League competition as well as the Murray River Warriors and CSU Muddogz who compete in the Murray Cup run under the banners of the New South Wales Rugby League and Victoria Rugby League. Albury Thunder Juniors is one of the largest Rugby league Clubs outside of metropolitan areas, Albury Thunder Juniors offer Rugby League League Tag to the border's young men and women from 5 years to 16 years.

The Albury-Wodonga Steamers are the local rugby union club, playing in the Southern Inland Rugby Union competition. The Steamers have produced several players for the Australian Rugby Union National Talent Squad.

The Albury Wodonga Bandits compete in the South East Australian Basketball League (SEABL) East Conference of the Australian Basketball Association (ABA), playing their home games at the Lauren Jackson Sports Centre (previously known as the Albury Sports Stadium). The Lady Bandits joined the women's SEABL in 2006. The Albury Gold Cup horse race is the major autumn event for the district. In 2005, it attracted a record crowd in excess of 18,600 racegoers. Albury has lately become a stronghold of junior hockey, boasting one of the few synthetic fields in the area. The town also has the Albury Grass Tennis Courts. Supercars Championship team Brad Jones Racing is based in Albury, making it the only team in the championship to have its workshop in New South Wales.

Albury is the birthplace of tennis player Margaret Court, winner of 62 Women's Grand Slam titles including eleven Australian titles, four Grand Slam singles titles played in one year (1970), four mixed doubles titles with Ken Fletcher in 1963 and many other titles around the world. WNBA MVP winner Lauren Jackson, NRL Player Adrian Purtell, and test cricketer Steve Rixon are among other champion sports people from the area.

In the 1992 Cricket World Cup, the Lavington Sports Ground hosted Albury's only international cricket match. It was a One Day International in which Zimbabwe defeated England in the biggest upset of the tournament.

Notable crime
Albury's most notorious crime is also one of Australia's most famous, the 'Pyjama Girl Murder' in 1934. Other notable crimes include the murders of Bronwynne Richardson who was abducted on Smollett Street on 12 October 1973. Her body was found in Horseshoe Lagoon two days later. The case has never been solved despite a coronial inquest in 2011 which resulted in an arrest. In another case, on 23 March 1996, Kim Meredith was murdered in Macauley Street while walking from Sodens Hotel to the Termo Hotel. A memorial to Kim was later placed in Queen Elizabeth II Square by the citizens of Albury.

Heritage listings 
The following buildings, structures, and ephemera in Albury are listed in various heritage registers:

Notable people

 Damien Brown (mixed martial artist)
 Margaret Court (tennis player)
 Dylan Edwards (rugby league player)
 Alexander England (actor)
 Carly Findlay (writer and activist)
 Dianne Fromholtz (tennis player)
 Lisa Ho (fashion designer)
 Noel Hodda (actor)
 Matt Holmes (actor)
 Lauren Jackson (basketball player)
 Hayley Jensen (singer)
 Brad Jones (racing driver)
 Lee Kernaghan (singer and 2008 Australian of the Year)
 Tania Kernaghan (singer)
 Brett Kirk (Australian rules footballer)
 Maggie Kirkpatrick (actress)
 Lee'Mon (singer)
 Ken Maynard (cartoonist of Ettamogah Pub)
 Malcolm McEachern (singer)
 Anthony Miles (Australian rules footballer)
 Lisa Mitchell (singer)
 Adam Nable (rugby league player)
 Ellie Pashley (runner)
 Adrian Purtell (rugby league)
 David Reynolds (racing driver)
 Richard Roxburgh (actor)
 Dr 'Paddy' Ryan (priest)
 Will Setterfield (Australian rules footballer)
 Charlie Spargo (Australian rules footballer)
 Clementine Stoney (Olympic swimmer)
 Terry Underwood (author)
 Charles Waterstreet (barrister and author)
 William Cleaver Woods (pioneer in medical science)

See also

 Christmas Eye, a seasonal epidemic of corneal ulceration which predominantly occurs only within a particular region of Australia
 Albury Wodonga Football Association

References

Further reading and viewing

External links

 Albury City Council
 Albury Wodonga Football Association
 
 

 
Suburbs of Albury, New South Wales
Populated places on the Murray River
Populated places established in the 1830s
Proposed sites for national capital of Australia